The 2011–12 OHL season was the 32nd season of the Ontario Hockey League. Twenty teams played 68 games each during the regular season schedule, which started on September 21, 2011 and ended on March 18, 2012. The playoffs began on Thursday March 22, 2012 and concluded on Friday May 11, 2012. The London Knights won the J. Ross Robertson Cup for the second time in franchise history. London secured a berth in the 2012 Memorial Cup hosted by the Shawinigan Cataractes of the QMJHL.

Regular season

Final standings
Note: DIV = Division; GP = Games played; W = Wins; L = Losses; OTL = Overtime losses; SL = Shootout losses; GF = Goals for; GA = Goals against; PTS = Points; x = clinched playoff berth; y = clinched division title; z = clinched conference title

Eastern conference

Western conference

Scoring leaders

Note: GP = Games played; G = Goals; A = Assists; Pts = Points; PIM = Penalty minutes

Leading goaltenders

Note: GP = Games played; Mins = Minutes played; W = Wins; L = Losses: OTL = Overtime losses; SL = Shootout losses; GA = Goals Allowed; SO = Shutouts; GAA = Goals against average

Playoffs

Conference quarterfinals

Eastern conference quarterfinals

(1) Niagara IceDogs vs. (8) Oshawa Generals

(2) Ottawa 67's vs. (7) Belleville Bulls

(3) Barrie Colts vs. (6) Mississauga St.Michael's Majors

(4) Brampton Battalion vs. (5) Sudbury Wolves

Western conference quarterfinals

(1) London Knights vs. (8) Windsor Spitfires

(2) Plymouth Whalers vs. (7) Guelph Storm

(3) Kitchener Rangers vs. (6) Owen Sound Attack

(4) Sarnia Sting vs. (5) Saginaw Spirit

Conference semifinals

Eastern conference semifinals

(1) Niagara IceDogs vs. (4) Brampton Battalion

(2) Ottawa 67's vs. (3) Barrie Colts

Western conference Semifinals

(1) London Knights vs. (5) Saginaw Spirit

(2) Plymouth Whalers vs. (3) Kitchener Rangers

Conference finals

Eastern conference finals

(1) Niagara IceDogs vs. (2) Ottawa 67's

Western conference finals

(1) London Knights vs. (3) Kitchener Rangers

J. Ross Robertson Cup

(W1) London Knights vs. (E1) Niagara IceDogs

J. Ross Robertson Cup Champions Roster

Playoff scoring leaders
Note: GP = Games played; G = Goals; A = Assists; Pts = Points; PIM = Penalty minutes

Playoff leading goaltenders

Note: GP = Games played; Mins = Minutes played; W = Wins; L = Losses: OTL = Overtime losses; SL = Shootout losses; GA = Goals Allowed; SO = Shutouts; GAA = Goals against average

All-Star teams
The OHL All-Star Teams were selected by the OHL's General Managers.

First team
Michael Sgarbossa, Centre, Sudbury Wolves
Brandon Saad, Left Wing, Saginaw Spirit
Tyler Toffoli, Right Wing, Ottawa 67's
Dougie Hamilton, Defence, Niagara IceDogs
Scott Harrington, Defence, London Knights
Michael Houser, Goaltender, London Knights
Greg Gilbert, Coach, Saginaw Spirit

Second team
Sean Monahan, Centre, Ottawa 67's
Tanner Pearson, Left Wing, Barrie Colts
Seth Griffith, Right Wing, London Knights
Cody Ceci, Defence, Ottawa 67's
Ryan Murphy, Defence, Kitchener Rangers
Mark Visentin, Goaltender, Niagara IceDogs
Steve Spott, Coach, Kitchener Rangers

Third team
Alex Friesen, Centre, Niagara IceDogs
Andrew Agozzino, Left Wing, Niagara IceDogs
Nail Yakupov, Right Wing, Sarnia Sting
Beau Schmitz, Defence, Plymouth Whalers
Ryan Sproul, Defence, Sault Ste. Marie Greyhounds
John Gibson, Goaltender, Kitchener Rangers
Stan Butler, Coach, Brampton Battalion

Awards

2012 OHL Priority Selection
On April 7, 2012, the OHL conducted the 2012 Ontario Hockey League Priority Selection. The Erie Otters held the first overall pick in the draft, and selected Connor McDavid from the Toronto Marlboros. McDavid was awarded the Jack Ferguson Award, awarded to the top pick in the draft.

Below are the players who were selected in the first round of the 2012 Ontario Hockey League Priority Selection.

2012 NHL Entry Draft
On June 22-23, 2012, the National Hockey League conducted the 2012 NHL Entry Draft held at the Consol Energy Center in Pittsburgh, Pennsylvania. In total, 48 players from the Ontario Hockey League were selected in the draft. Nail Yakupov of the Sarnia Sting was the first player from the OHL to be selected, as he was taken with the first overall pick by the Edmonton Oilers.

Below are the players selected from OHL teams at the NHL Entry Draft.

2012 CHL Import Draft
On June 27, 2012, the Canadian Hockey League conducted the 2012 CHL Import Draft, in which teams in all three CHL leagues participate in. The Erie Otters held the first pick in the draft by a team in the OHL, and selected Oscar Dansk from Sweden with their selection.

Below are the players who were selected in the first round by Ontario Hockey League teams in the 2012 CHL Import Draft.

See also
 2012 Memorial Cup
 List of OHL seasons
 2011–12 QMJHL season
 2011–12 WHL season
 2011 NHL Entry Draft
 List of OHA Junior A standings
 2011 in ice hockey
 2012 in ice hockey

External links
 Official website of the Ontario Hockey League
 Official website of the Canadian Hockey League
 Official website of the MasterCard Memorial Cup
 Official website of the Subway Super Series

References

Ontario Hockey League seasons
Ohl